The 2022 United Conservative Party leadership election was held on October 6, 2022, in Alberta to select a new leader of the United Conservative Party and Premier of Alberta. The leadership election was triggered following the May 18, 2022, leadership review in which the United Conservative Party membership voted 51.4 per cent in support of incumbent Premier Jason Kenney's leadership. In Kenney's speech following the announcement of the results, Kenney issued his resignation as leader of the United Conservative Party. Nominations for leadership of the United Conservative Party closed on July 20, 2022, with seven candidates meeting the nomination criteria. Party members selected their preference for leader using instant-runoff voting between September 2 and October 3, 2022. 

On October 6, 2022, the result were announced with former Wildrose Party leader Danielle Smith being elected as leader of the United Conservative Party, defeating all other candidates including former Minister of Finance Travis Toews after six ballot counts. A week later on October 11, 2022, Smith was sworn in as the 19th Premier of Alberta.

Background

Formation of the United Conservative Party and Jason Kenney's leadership 
In March 2017, former federal cabinet minister Jason Kenney was elected Progressive Conservative Association of Alberta leader on a platform of joining with the Wildrose Party to form a unified right-of-centre party. Two months later Kenney and Wildrose leader Brian Jean jointly announced that the question of a merger between parties would be posed to the membership of each party through a vote, which on July 22, 2017, was approved by the membership in both parties.

Following the merger approval a leadership contest was held with three candidates, Kenney, former Wildrose leader Jean, and attorney Doug Schweitzer. Kenney was elected leader of the newly formed United Conservative Party with a plurality of 61.2 per cent of the vote. The Kenney lead United Conservative Party swept into power in the April 2019 Alberta general election, capturing 63 of 87 seats in the Legislative Assembly of Alberta, forming a majority government, and defeating the incumbent Alberta New Democratic Party led by Rachel Notley. On April 30, 2019, Jason Kenney was sworn in as the 18th Premier of Alberta.

2022 United Conservative Party leadership review 
One year after the United Conservative Party was swept into power, the COVID-19 pandemic reached Alberta. Kenney's approval ratings amongst Albertans and members of the United Conservative Party began to slip following successive waves of the COVID-19 pandemic. Earlier Angus Reid polling reports said that, "Albertans have grown increasingly critical" of Premier Kenney and the UCP "government's response to the coronavirus, and the province's finances are in historically poor shape with oil revenues plummeting and pandemic-related economic shocks persisting." The June 2021 report said that "both sides" of Alberta's "political spectrum" have been angered by Kenney's response to the pandemic; they are critical of his approach to pandemic-related restrictions.

On September 17, 2021, Joel Mullan, United Conservative Party Vice President of policy, publicly called for the party board to consider initiating an early leadership review of Premier Kenny. Later in September, the United Conservative Party board announced a leadership review would take place at the Party's annual general meeting in April 2022, ahead of the previous plans for a leadership review to take place in Fall 2022. In March 2022, the United Conservative Party changed the format for the leadership review, moving to a mail-in ballot beginning in April 2022, with results to be announced on May 18, 2022. The change in format was criticized by some party membership including Brian Jean.

On May 18, 2022, after receiving support from 51.4 per cent of the United Conservative Party members, Kenney announced he would step down as leader of the United Conservative Party. The United Conservative Party caucus met on May 19, 2022, and caucus chair Nathan Neudorf released a statement affirming that Kenney would remain as leader of the party until a new leader is elected. Kenney subsequently sent a letter to the party secretary informing her of his intention to resign as leader of the party after a new leader is elected.

Leadership contest 
The United Conservative Party leadership election process was conducted using instant-runoff voting, whereby voters may rank as many candidates as they desired and an individual is considered elected once they reached more than 50 per cent of the votes. With the instant-runoff format, if no candidate receives more than 50 per cent of the vote, the candidate with the lowest per cent of support is removed from the contest, and the removed candidates ballot second choices are redistributed to the remaining candidates. Rick Orman, a former Progressive Conservative Association of Alberta Member of the Legislative Assembly, and unsuccessful leadership candidate in the 1992 Progressive Conservative Association of Alberta leadership election served as the returning officer, and announced the results of each ballot.

Albertans were eligible to vote in the leadership election if they had purchased a party membership prior to August 12, 2022. Mail-in voting opened on September 2 and continued until October 3, 2022.

Some did not rank all the candidates. By the Sixth Count, about 6000 votes had become "exhausted". As exhausted votes accumulated, to win, the successful candidate had to merely acquire a majority of votes still in play, not majority of total valid votes cast in the First Count.

The total valid votes cast in the first round numbered 84,193. The majority required to win in the first round was 42,297. The lowest ranked candidate in each round was dropped, with their votes redistributed, until the sixth round when Smith's vote total exceeded 50%.

Timeline
May 18, 2022 - Party announces results of the 2022 UCP Special General Meeting with 51.4 per cent of party members voted in favour of Kenney staying on as leader. Kenney announces his intentions to resign. Brian Jean declares his candidacy. 
May 19, 2022 - UCP Caucus votes to allow Kenney to remain as leader until a new leader is elected by the party. Danielle Smith declares her candidacy.
May 31, 2022 - Travis Toews declares his candidacy.
June 1, 2022 - Todd Loewen declares his candidacy.
June 2, 2022 - Bill Rock declares his candidacy.
June 7, 2022 - Leela Aheer declares her candidacy.
June 13, 2022 - Rajan Sawhney declares her candidacy.
June 14, 2022 - Rebecca Schulz declares her candidacy.
June 28, 2022 - Jon Horsman declares his candidacy.
June 29, 2022 - Raj Sherman declares his candidacy.
July 20, 2022 - Candidate entry deadline.
August 12, 2022 - Membership cut-off date.
September 2, 2022 - Mail-in voting begins.
October 3, 2022 - Deadline for mail-in ballots.
October 6, 2022 - Results announced.

Candidates

Approved

Leela Aheer
Background
Leela Aheer, 51, is the MLA for Chestermere-Strathmore (2019–present), former MLA for Chestermere-Rocky View (2015–2019) and Deputy Leader of the United Conservative Party (2017–2021). She is the former Minister of Culture, Multiculturalism & Status of Women (2019–2021).
Date candidacy declared: June 7, 2022
Date candidacy registered with Elections Alberta: June 13, 2022
Date candidacy approved: July 22, 2022
Campaign website: https://www.voteleela.ca/
Campaign slogan: Lead with Leela

Brian Jean
Background
Brian Jean, 59, is the MLA for Fort McMurray-Lac La Biche (2022–present). He was the final Leader of the Wildrose Party (2015–2017), Leader of the Opposition (2015–2017), MLA for Fort McMurray-Conklin (2015–2017), MP for Athabasca (2004–2006) and Fort McMurray—Athabasca (2006–2014), and Parliamentary Secretary to the Minister of Transport, Infrastructure and Communities (2006–2011).
Date candidacy declared:  May 18, 2022
Date candidacy registered with Elections Alberta: May 31, 2022
Date candidacy approved: July 19, 2022
Campaign website: https://www.brianjean.ca/
Campaign slogan: Autonomy for Albertans

Todd Loewen
Background
Todd Loewen, 55, is the independent MLA for Central Peace-Notley (2019–present) and former MLA for Grande Prairie-Smoky (2015-2019). He was expelled from the UCP in 2021 after criticizing the government response to COVID-19. He previously served as the UCP Caucus Chair (2019-2021).
Date candidacy declared:  June 1, 2022
Date candidacy registered with Elections Alberta: June 1, 2022
Date candidacy approved: July 22, 2022
Campaign website: https://www.toddloewen.com/
Campaign slogan: Your Alberta, Your Way

Rajan Sawhney
Background 
Rajan Sawhney is the MLA for Calgary-North East (2019–present) and Minister of Transportation (2021–present). She is the former Minister of Community and Social Services (2019–2021).
Date candidacy declared: June 13, 2022
Date candidacy registered with Elections Alberta: June 16, 2022
Date candidacy approved: July 21, 2022
Campaign website: https://www.rajansawhney.ca/
Campaign slogan: Forward

Rebecca Schulz
Background
Rebecca Schulz is the MLA for Calgary-Shaw (2019–present) and Minister of Children's Services (2019–present).
Date candidacy declared: June 14, 2022
Date candidacy registered with Elections Alberta: June 14, 2022
Date candidacy approved: July 22, 2022
Campaign website: https://www.rebeccaforleader.ca/
Campaign slogan: Back On Track

Danielle Smith
Background
Danielle Smith, 51, is a UCP nomination candidate in Livingstone-Macleod. She was the MLA for Highwood (2012–2015), the Leader of the Opposition (2012–2014), and leader of the Wildrose Party (2009–2014).
Date candidacy declared:  May 19, 2022
Date candidacy registered with Elections Alberta: June 1, 2022
Date candidacy approved: July 18, 2022
Campaign website: https://www.daniellesmith.ca/
Campaign slogan: Danielle Smith For Premier

Travis Toews
Background
Travis Toews, 57, is the MLA for Grande Prairie-Wapiti (2019–present) and former Minister of Finance and President of the Treasury Board (2019–2022).
Date candidacy declared: May 31, 2022
Date candidacy registered with Elections Alberta: May 30, 2022 
Date candidacy approved: July 5, 2022
Campaign website: https://www.toewsforalberta.ca/
Campaign slogan: Toews For Alberta

Withdrew or failed to qualify

Jon Horsman
Background
Jon Horsman is a former ATB Financial executive. After withdrawing, he endorsed Travis Toews.
Date candidacy declared: June 28, 2022
Date candidacy registered with Elections Alberta: June 29, 2022
Date withdrew:  July 20, 2022
Campaign website: http://jonhorsman.ca/
Campaign slogan: Refresh Alberta Now!

Bill Rock
Background
Bill Rock is the mayor of Amisk. He was the Wildrose Party candidate for Wetaskiwin-Camrose in the 2015 Alberta general election, finishing third. After withdrawing, he endorsed Jon Horsman.
Date candidacy declared:  June 2, 2022
Date candidacy registered with Elections Alberta: June 2, 2022
Date withdrew:  July 9, 2022
Campaign website: https://billrock.ca/
Campaign slogan: Bill Rock For UCP Leader

Raj Sherman
Background
Raj Sherman is the former leader of the Alberta Liberal Party (2011–2015), Leader of the Opposition (2011–2012), and MLA for Edmonton-Meadowlark (2008–2015). He currently works as an emergency physician. He requested an exemption to run in the race for not being a party member for 6 months, however it was rejected by the UCP Leadership Election Committee. Despite his exemption being denied, he still plans to run for the leadership and submit all the papers. On July 25, it was announced that Sherman was still denied a chance to enter the race.
Date candidacy declared:  June 29, 2022
Date candidacy registered with Elections Alberta: June 24, 2022
Campaign website: https://electraj.ca/
Campaign slogan: Experienced.  Caring.  Decisive.

Declined
Rona Ambrose, Interim Leader of the Conservative Party of Canada and Leader of the Official Opposition (2015–2017), MP for Sturgeon River—Parkland (2015–2017) and Edmonton—Spruce Grove, Alberta (2004–2015), Minister of Health (2013–2015), Minister of Public Works and Government Services (2010–2013), Minister of Labour (2008–2010), Minister of Intergovernmental Affairs (2007–2008), Minister of the Environment (2006–2007)
Rob Anderson, former MLA for Airdrie (2012–2015) and Airdrie-Chestermere (2008–2012).
Drew Barnes, Independent MLA for Cypress-Medicine Hat (2012–present).
Nathan Cooper, MLA for Olds-Didsbury-Three Hills (2015–present), Speaker of the Alberta Legislative Assembly (2019-present), Leader of the Opposition in Alberta (2017), Interim Leader of the United Conservative Party (2017), and Carstairs Municipal Councillor (2010-2015).
Jason Copping, MLA for Calgary-Varsity (2019-present), Minister of Health (2021–present), and Minister of Labour and Immigration (2019–2021).
Devin Dreeshen, MLA for Innisfail-Sylvan Lake (2018–present). He previously held the position of Minister of Agriculture and Forestry (2019–2021).
Peter Guthrie, MLA for Airdrie-Cochrane (2019–present).
Nate Horner, MLA for Drumheller-Stettler (2019–present) and Minister of Agriculture, Forestry and Rural Economic Development. (2021–present). He previously served as the Associate Minister of Rural Economic Development (2021).
Jason Kenney, Premier of Alberta (2019–present), MLA for Calgary-Lougheed (2017–present), Leader of the United Conservative Party (2017–present), Leader of the Opposition in Alberta (2018-2019), Leader of the Progressive Conservative Association of Alberta (2017), Minister of National Defence (2015), Minister of Employment and Social Development (2013–2015), Minister of Citizenship, Immigration and Multiculturalism (2008–2013), MP for Calgary Midnapore, Alberta (2015–2016) and Calgary Southeast, Alberta (1997–2015).
Adriana LaGrange, MLA for Red Deer-North (2019–present), Minister of Education (2019–present), Red Deer Catholic Regional Division Trustee (2007–2018)
Kaycee Madu, MLA for Edmonton-South West (2019–present) and Minister Labour and Immigration (2022 - Present). He previously served as Minister of Justice and Solicitor General (2020-2022) and as Minister of Municipal Affairs (2019-2020).
Ric McIver, MLA for Calgary-Hays (2012–present) and Minister of Municipal Affairs (2021 - Present). In addition to his current roles, he served as Alison Redford's Minister of Transportation (2012–2013) and previously held the posts of Minister of Transportation (2019–2021), Minister of Jobs, Skills, Training and Labour (2014–2015), Minister of Infrastructure (2013–2014), and Minister of Municipal Affairs (2012–2013). He was also the Interim Leader of the Progressive Conservative Association of Alberta (2015–2017), and City of Calgary Alderman Ward 12 (2001-2010).
Nathan Neudorf, MLA for Lethbridge-East (2019–present), Parliamentary Secretary to the Minister of Environment and Parks for Water Stewardship (2021-present), and UCP Caucus Chair (2021-present).
Demetrios Nicolaides, MLA for Calgary-Bow (2019–present) and Minister of Advanced Education (2019–present).
Jason Nixon, MLA for Rimbey-Rocky Mountain House-Sundre (2015–present), Minister of Environment and Parks of Alberta (2019–present), and former Leader of the Opposition in Alberta (2017–2018).
Jeremy Nixon, MLA for Calgary-Klein (2019–present) and Parliamentary Secretary to the Minister of Community and Social Services for Civil Society (2021–present).
Michelle Rempel Garner, MP for Calgary Nose Hill (2011–present). She has also held the positions of Shadow Minister for Natural Resources (2021–present), Shadow Minister for Health (2020–2021), and Minister of Western Economic Diversification (2013–2015).
Sonya Savage, MLA for Calgary-North West (2019–present) and Minister of Energy (2019–present).
Doug Schweitzer, MLA for Calgary-Elbow (2019–present), Minister of Jobs, Economy and Innovation (2020–present), Minister of Justice and Solicitor General (2019–2020) and 2017 United Conservative Party leadership election contestant.
Tyler Shandro, MLA for Calgary-Acadia (2019–present), Minister of Justice and Solicitor General of Alberta (2022–present), Minister of Labour and Immigration (2021–2022), and Minister of Health (2019–2021).
Chris Warkentin, MP for Grande Prairie—Mackenzie (2006–present)

Results

% of Vote Share by Round

Opinion polling

UCP supporters

All Albertans

Notes

References

Opinion poll sources 

Political party leadership elections in Alberta
2022 in Alberta
United Conservative Party leadership elections
2022 political party leadership elections
2022 elections in Canada
October 2022 events in Canada